Elena Bovina and Nenad Zimonjić won the title at the 2004 Australian Open, defeating the defending champions Martina Navratilova and Leander Paes in the final 6–1, 7–6(7–3).

Seeds

Draw

Finals

Top half

Bottom half

External links
Draw (WTA)
 2004 Australian Open – Doubles draws and results at the International Tennis Federation

Mixed doubles
Australian Open (tennis) by year – Mixed doubles